Marcus Hall (August 12, 1887 – February 24, 1915) was a Major League Baseball pitcher who played for the St. Louis Browns in  and the Detroit Tigers from  to .

See also
 List of baseball players who died during their careers

External links

St. Louis Browns players
Detroit Tigers players
Major League Baseball pitchers
Baseball players from Missouri
Tulsa Oilers (baseball) players
Independence Champs players
Springfield Midgets players
Joplin Miners players
Omaha Rourkes players
1887 births
1915 deaths